The Alberta Football League (AFL) is an amateur Canadian football league.  The league's schedule runs from the start of June through to the end of September.  

The Alberta Football League was established in 1984 so that men over the age of 21 could continue to play organized competitive football within the province of Alberta.  Before the creation of the league, the only way to play competitive football after university or junior was the Canadian Football League.

In 1984–85 the league consisted of seven teams.  They were: the Calgary Raiders, the Calgary Cowboys, the Calgary Crude, the Red Deer Redskins, the Rocky Warriors, the Hinton Grizzlies, and the Brownfield Bruisers.

For the 2016 season the league consisted of nine teams.  They were: the Calgary Gators, the Calgary Wolfpack, the Central Alberta Buccaneers, the Lloydminster Vandals, the Grande Prairie Drillers, the Edmonton Raiders, Fort McMurray Monarchs, the St. Albert Stars and the Airdrie Irish.

In 1999, the AFL became a founding member of the Canadian Senior Football League, which is now known as the Canadian Major Football League.  The CMFL is the national governing body for semi-pro Canadian football, that arrange the National Championship game (the Forster Memorial Trophy game). At first, AFL champs played against the winner of the Eastern Conference (the Manitoba Football League), but since 2002 that game has been played against the Northern Football Conference winners (teams from Ontario and Quebec).

League champions and finalists
 2022: Airdrie Irish: 0 Cold Lake Fighter Jets: 55
 2021: Central Alberta Buccaneers: 47 Edmonton Elite: 17 
 2020: Cancelled due to COVID-19 pandemic
 2019: Central Alberta Buccaneers: 26 Calgary Wolfpack: 30
 2018: Central Alberta Buccaneers: 7 Fort McMurray Monarchs: 65 
 2017: Calgary Gators: 32 Fort McMurray Monarchs: 21
 2016: Fort McMurray Monarchs: 32 Central Alberta Buccaneers: 23
 2015: Fort McMurray Monarchs: 24 Calgary Gators: 37
 2014: Calgary Wolfpack: 25 Calgary Gators: 15
 2013: St. Albert Stars: 16 Calgary Gators: 41
 2012: Lloydminster Vandals: 62 Calgary Wolfpack: 26
2011: Calgary Wolfpack: 38 Grande Prairie Drillers: 14
2010: Lloydminster Vandals: 52 Calgary Gators: 26
2009: Edmonton Stallions: 39 Calgary Wolfpack: 32
2008: Calgary Wolfpack: 43 Lloydminster Vandals: 21
2007: Edmonton Stallions: 21 Calgary Gators: 16
2006: Calgary Wolfpack: 31 Calgary Gators: 7
2005: Calgary Wolfpack: 42 Edmonton Stallions: 28
2004: Calgary Wolfpack: 51 Edmonton Stallions: 46
2003: Calgary Wolfpack: 56 Calgary Thunder: 35
2002: Calgary Wolfpack: 49 Calgary Gators: 15
2001: Calgary Thunder: 16 Calgary Gators: 14
2000: Calgary Wolfpack: 30 Calgary Thunder: 14
1999: Calgary Wolfpack: 17 Calgary Gators: 2
1998: Calgary Gators: Calgary Wolfpack:
1997: Red Deer Sooners:  7 Edmonton Icemen: 3
1996: Calgary Wolfpack: Red Deer Sooners:
1995: Calgary Wolfpack: Red Deer Sooners:
1994: Red Deer Sooners: Edmonton Seminoles:
1993: Red Deer Sooners: Calgary Wolfpack:
1992: Calgary Wolfpack: Red Deer Sooners:
1991: Red Deer Sooners: Calgary Crude:
1990: Calgary Wolfpack: Calgary Crude:
1989: Calgary Wolfpack: Red Deer Sooners:
1988: Calgary Raiders: Calgary Crude:
1987: Calgary Raiders: Red Deer Redskins:
1986: Calgary Raiders: Calgary Crude:
1985: Calgary Raiders: Calgary Thunder:

AFL championships by franchise

Current AFL teams

Defunct AFL teams
Brownfield Bruisers (1984–1985)
Calgary Cowboys (1984–1988, 1991–1996)
Calgary Crude (1984–1992)
Calgary Gators (1998–2017)
Calgary Raiders (1985–1988)
Calgary Coyotes (2001–2003)
Calgary Razorbacks (2004–2005)
Calgary Thunder (2000–2007)
Edmonton Seminoles (1993–1994)
Edmonton Garrison Army (2010–2012)
Edmonton Seahawks (?–2009)
Edmonton Icemen (1995–2004)
Edmonton Stallions (2002–2015)
Hanna Rams (1976–1984)
Hinton Grizzlies (1984–?)
Lloydminster Vandals (2004–2018)
Medicine Hat Marauders (2005–2006)
Okotoks Bearcats (1995–1997)
Red Deer Redskins (1985–1987)
Red Deer Sooners (1988–1999)
Rocky Warriors (1984–?)
Rocky Raiders (1983–1984)
Wainwright Longhorns (2005–2007)
Edmonton Renegades (2009–2011)
Edmonton Raiders (2016–2016)
Parkland Predators (2017–2017)
St. Albert Stars (?–2019)

References

External links

Airdrie Irish
Central Alberta Buccaneers 
Fort McMurray Monarchs 
Grande Prairie Drillers 
Edmonton Elite Football 

Canadian football in Alberta
2
1984 establishments in Alberta
Sports leagues established in 1984